The Abyssinian is a 1997 historical adventure novel by Jean-Christophe Rufin.

Plot introduction
The Abyssinian tells the story of a young French physician who is sent as part of a diplomatic mission to Abyssinia in the early eighteenth century. Along the way he must face various perils while trying to win over his true love.

Characters in "The Abyssinian"
 Jean-Baptiste Poncet: a French apothecarian who has been practicing medicine without a formal license.
 Maître Juremi: a colleague of Jean-Baptiste who has fled France because of his Protestant religious beliefs
 Monsieur de Maillet: the French consul in Cairo
 Monsieur de Macé: an expert linguist who works for Monsieur de Maillet

External links
 Amazon.com: Reviews

1997 French novels
French adventure novels
French historical novels
Novels set in Ethiopia
W. W. Norton & Company books
1997 debut novels